Praia da Vitória (translating as "Beach of Victory") is a municipality in the Portuguese archipelago of the Azores.

History

The area of Praia, was one of the first points colonized on the island of Terceira. Praia constituted the seat of the Donatary-Captaincy of Terceira between 1456 and 1474; the island's first Captain, Jácome de Bruges along with his first lieutenant, Diogo de Teive, established their residency at this site. By 1474, the island was divided into two captaincies (Praia and Angra): the Captaincy of Praia reverted to Álvaro Martins Homem, Bruges' successor. The growth of the woad industry and export wheat market concentrated along the fertile Ramo Grande area, allowed Praia to grow rapidly. Consequently, Praia was elevated to the status of vila (comparable to town) in 1480 (then still within the administration of Álvaro Martins Homem).

By the last quarter of the 16th century, Gaspar Frutuoso (the celebrated Azorean historian), wrote of Praia in these terms:

During the Iberian Union, King Philip II of Spain ordered an armada to Terceira to impose the governorship of Ambrósia de Aguiar Coutinho on his unruly subjects in the Azores and facilitate shipping to the Indies. Under the command of Pedro de Valdez, the fleet arrived in Santa Maria with seven large carracks and 1000 troops, took on provisions and sailed for São Miguel in the spring (where Governor Ambrósio de Aguiar Coutinho and his cousin supplied the group). After an initial assault on Angra, Valdez rushed to assault the island, disembarking troops at the Casa da Salga, in the valley of Porto Judeu (a mile from Vila de São Sebastião), incensed that King Phillip was sending a larger contingent to capture Terceira. The Battle of Salga became an important event in the village of São Sebastião (then a parish of Praia) broke out along the coast in 1582.

During the Restoration of Portuguese Independence, the citizenry of Praia acclaimed King John IV, when Francisco Ornelas da Câmara arrived in Terceira.

The settlement was destroyed during the 1614 Caída da Praia earthquake, with many of the residents along the coast lost to the sea. Along the 17th century, even as the community was being re-constructed, there were several seismic aftershocks.

During the Liberal Wars, the harbour was the scene of a naval battle (in 1829) between the Liberals and the Absolutists, competing factions in support of King Pedro IV and King Miguel, respectively, during the Liberal Wars. The Battle of Praia ensued when a squadron of Miguelist troops attempted to disembark at Praia (11 August 1829). As a result of this victory, Queen Maria II after being restored to the throne, acted to recognize its residents for their heroism by appending "Mui Notável" (Very notable) and "da Vitória" (of the Victoria) to its name (12 January 1837): it was at this time that Praia became known as Praia da Vitória.

Its importance in the economy of the north continued, even after the second Caída da Praia earthquake (on 15 June 1841), that partially destroyed the settlement. Its reconstruction, at the end of the 19th century was motivated by councillor José Silvestre Ribeiro. As priest Jerónimo Emiliano de Andrade (who lived in the town at the time), referred to Praia da Vitória:

The town was elevated to city on 20 June 1981, although it continued to be referred to as the Vila da Praia da Vitória (until 1983). In the second half of the 20th century, a large aerodrome was constructed along the southwestern side of the Portuguese Air Base No.4. In addition, the port of Praia was expanded to include a 1400-metre extension. These two projects have supported the municipality's growth, along with its large industrial centre.

Geography

Praia da Vitória occupies the northern and eastern coasts of Terceira, bisecting it from northwest to southeast, through a varied geomorphology.

Administratively, the municipality of Praia da Vitória is divided into the following civil parishes, which handle local distribution of services and support the local residents:

 Agualva
 Biscoitos
 Cabo da Praia
 Fonte do Bastardo
 Fontinhas
 Lajes
 Porto Martins
 Santa Cruz
 Quatro Ribeiras
 São Brás
 Vila Nova

The urban centre, that includes the parishes of Lajes and Santa Cruz, fronts a ridge known as Facho that overlooks the airport of Lajes. It was used as a lookout for pirates and invaders, and later as marine military semaphore station and primitive lighthouse (lasting for 400 years). Apart from pasture-lands, the ridge was occupied by marine/naval housing and support buildings for Portuguese Air Base 4. At the far end is a monument dedicated to the Sacred Heart of Mary and lookout.

Economy
Praia da Vitória is a services, fishing and agricultural municipality and boasts a large marina, popular with the yachting community, with the only sizeable sand beach on Terceira.

Lajes Air Base, a joint United States and Portuguese air force base, lies three kilometers to the north of the town. American servicemen frequent the restaurants and clubs in the town and add considerably to the local economy.

Architecture
The town boasts two notable churches, several public squares, and a number of hotels and restaurants.

Civic

 Cocklestove of Boa Vista
 Cocklestove of Rua Gervásio Lima
 Customshouse of Praia da Vitória
 Fountain of Biscoito Bravo
 Fountain of Caminho Novo
 Fountain of Cruz do Pico
 Fountain of Largo Comendador Pamplona
 Fountain of Largo Conde da Praia da Vitória
 Fountain of Largo da Luz
 Fountain of Ribeira da Areia
 Fountain of Pico da Rocha
 Fountain of Largo Francisco Maria Brum
 Fountain of the Amoreiras
 Fountain of the Barreiro
 Fountain of the Caldeira of Lajes
 Fountain of the Canada da Bezerra
 Fountain of the Cruzeiro
 Fountain of the Cruzeiro of Lajes
 Fountain of the Fontinhas
 Fountain of the Fundões
 Fountain of the Ladeira do Cardoso
 Fountain of the Malícias
 Fountain of the Quatro Canadas
 Hospital of the Misericórdia
 Hospital of São Lázaro
 Municipal Hall of Praia da Vitória
 Municipal Market of Praia da Vitóra
 Ramo Grande Auditorium
 Residence of Vitorino Nemésio
 Residence of Roda
 Watermill of Rua dos Moinhos
Watermill of Agualva
 City wall, built of volcanic stones on the beach to protect the city against tsunamis and pirates

Military
 Fort of Chagas
 Fort of São João
 Fort of Luz
 Fort of Nossa Senhora da Nazaré
 Fort of Rua Longa 
 Fort of São Bento
 Fort of São Caetano
 Fort of Santa Catarina
 Fort of São Filipe
 Fort of Santo Antão
Fort of the Espírito Santo, little remains of this 16th century fort situated on the northern edge of the Bay of Praia, which was bombarded and nearly destroyed during the Liberal conflict. Its remnants survived to the 20th century, but were obliterated during the construction and support of the northern pier, even after a Luso-American compromise was established for its recuperation.
 Fort of the Porto
 Fort of the Porto of Biscoitos
 Fort Grande
 Post of the Fiscal Guard of Praia da Vitória

Religious

 Church of Santa Cruz
 Church of Santa Bárbara
 Church of Santa Beatriz
 Church of São José, Santa Luzia e Santa Cruz
 Church of Senhor Santo Cristo das Misericórdias
 Hermitage of Nossa Senhora do Loreto
 Hermitage of Nossa Senhora dos Remédios, located in Santa Cruz, the early 17th century chapel survived the 1755 Lisbon earthquake, but it was only in the second half of the 18th century that any efforts were invested in restoring the chapel. Following the earthquake and effects of the tsunami, parishioners marched through the streets in procession for their deliverance;
 Hermitage of Santa Catarina
 Hermitage of Santa Rita
 Hermitage of Santo António
 Hermitage of São Lázaro
 Hermitage of São Salvador
 Império of the Holy Spirit of Fonte do Bastardo
 Império of the Holy Spirit of Quatro Ribeiras
 Império of the Holy Spirit of Santa Cruz
 Império of the Holy Spirit of São Pedro
 Império of the Sailors, built in 1877 by fishermen from the neighbouring island of Pico at Largo José Silvestre Ribeiro Square

Parks 
In the municipal park (Jardim municipal) a monument was erected in 1879 in memory of José Silvestre Ribeiro (1807–1891), a Portuguese politician who organized the reconstruction of the city after the earthquake in 1841.

Sport
It is popular with windsurfers because of the constant seabreezes. Praia da Vitoria hosts an annual triathlon and is known for its unique style of bullfighting, tourada à corda.

Notable citizens
 Álvaro Martins Homem III ( 1490 in Praia da Vitória – 1535) a nobleman, 3rd Donatary-Captain of Praia da Vitória
 Alberto del Canto (1547 in Praia da Vitória – 1611) conquistador and explorer of the north of Mexico
 Alexandre Martins Pamplona Ramos (1864 in Santa Cruz – 1933) a physician and politician.
 Vitorino Nemésio (1901 in Praia da Vitória – 1978) a poet, author and intellectual
 Luis Gil Bettencourt (born 1956 in Praia da Vitória) a Portuguese-American musician, songwriter and music producer.
 Artur Lima (born 1963 in Santa Cruz) a dentist and politician
 Nuno Bettencourt (born 1966 in Praia da Vitória) a Portuguese-American guitarist, singer-songwriter, and record producer; lead guitarist of the Boston rock band Extreme

References

External links

 http://www.ciberacores.com/santacruzpv – Website of the church of Santa Cruz (Praia) (only in Portuguese)
Photos from Praia da Vitória

 
Municipalities of the Azores